Elena Dementieva was the defending champion, but lost in the semifinals to Jelena Janković.

Janković went on to win the title, defeating Vera Zvonareva in the final 6–2, 6–4.

Seeds
The top four seeds received a bye into the second round.

Draw

Finals

Top half

Bottom half

External links
Draw and Qualifying Draw

Kremlin Cup
Kremlin Cup